Estefanía Aldaba-Lim, Ph.D. (born Estefanía "Fanny" Aldaba; January 6, 1917 – March 7, 2006) was the first female secretary of any Cabinet of the Philippines, serving as Secretary of Social Services and Development  from 1971 to 1977. She was also the first Filipina clinical psychologist.

Early life and education 
Aldaba was born in 1917, the fifth of 14 children. She was born and raised in Malolos, in the province of Bulacan, Philippines, by her father, a provincial treasurer of Malolos, and her mother, a homemaker.

Aldaba graduated with a Bachelor of Arts degree from Philippine Women's University in 1936, a Bachelor of Education degree from Philippine Women's University in 1938, and a Master of Arts in psychology from the University of the Philippines in 1939.

In 1942, Aldaba completed her PhD at the University of Michigan, becoming the first Filipina to earn a doctoral degree in clinical psychology.

Career
Aldaba-Lim returned to Manila in 1948. She established the Institute of Human Relations at Philippine Women's University, and was a founding member and president of the Philippine Association of Psychologists and of the Philippine Mental Health Association.

In 1971, Aldaba-Lim became the first woman cabinet member in the Philippines when she was appointed as Secretary of the Department of Social Services and Development (DSSD). She held this role until 1977.

In 1976 through 1977, Aldaba-Lim served as president of the Girl Scouts of the Philippines.

In 1976, Aldaba-Lim was elected the Asian regional representative of the UNESCO Executive Board. In 1979, she became was the first woman to become Special Ambassador to the United Nations, with the rank of assistant secretary general during the UNICEF—UNESCO International Year of the Child. She received the United Nations Peace Medal that year from Secretary General Kurt Waldheim.

In 1994, she founded the Museo Pambata, the Philippines's first children's museum, in the repurposed 1949 Manila Elks Club building in Manila.

Marriage and children 
Aldaba-Lim had six children with her husband Luis Lim, whom she married in 1944. Lim died in an airplane crash in 1962.

Death 
On March 7, 2006, at age 89, Aldaba-Lim died of leukemia at her home in Manila, Philippines.

See also

Museo Pambata, Manila

References

External links
Aldaba family website
Museo Pambata children's museum website — founded by Estefania Aldaba-Lim
Senate Resolution 74 honoring the legacy of Estefania Aldaba-Lim
UNICEF Special Envoy to the International Year of the Child with rank of Assistant Secretary General

Filipino diplomats
Filipino psychologists
Filipino women psychologists
UNICEF people
Filipino educators
Scouting in the Philippines
1917 births
2006 deaths
University of Michigan College of Literature, Science, and the Arts alumni
Ferdinand Marcos administration cabinet members
20th-century Filipino educators
20th-century Filipino women
21st-century Filipino women
Filipino officials of the United Nations
20th-century psychologists
Filipino expatriates in the United States